The 2013 Kenyan Premier League (known as the Tusker Premier League for sponsorship reasons) was the tenth season of the Kenyan Premier League since it began in 2003, marking a decade of its existence. It was also the Golden Jubilee season of top division football in Kenya since 1963. It began on 24 February 2013 and ended on 9 November 2013. League champions Gor Mahia earned a place in the preliminary round of the 2014 CAF Champions League while 2013 FKF President's Cup champions A.F.C. Leopards earned a place in the preliminary round of the 2014 CAF Confederation Cup.

A total of 16 teams competed for the league, with fourteen returning from the 2012 season and one team from each of the two zones of FKF Division One. This was the first ever season for Kakamega Homeboyz in the top flight.

After beating Kakamega Homeboyz on 27 October, Gor Mahia won the Kenyan Premier League title for a joint record 13th time, matching the record set by their rivals A.F.C. Leopards in 1998. It was also Gor Mahia's first title since 1995.

Changes from last season

Relegated from Premier League
 Rangers
 Oserian

Promoted from Division One
 Bandari
 Kakamega Homeboyz

Teams
Out of the 16 participating teams, 7 are based in the capital, Nairobi, while Bandari is the only team based at the Coast.

Stadia and locations

Head coaches

Managerial changes
As of 20:27, 29 September 2013 (UTC+3).

League table

Positions by round
The table lists the positions of teams after each week of matches. In order to preserve chronological evolvements, any postponed matches are not included to the round at which they were originally scheduled, but added to the full round they were played immediately afterwards. For example, if a match is scheduled for matchday 13, but then postponed and played between days 16 and 17, it will be added to the standings for day 16.

Results

Top scorers

Last updated: 9 November 2013

See also
 2013 Kenyan Women's Premier League
 2013 FKF President's Cup
 2013 KPL Top 8 Cup
 2013 Kenyan Super Cup (pre-season)
 2013 Kenyan Super Cup (post-season)

References

Kenya
Kenyan
Kenya
Kenyan
1
2013